Wundwin  is a township of Meiktila District in the Mandalay Division of Burma.

See also
 List of villages in Wundwin Township

References

Townships of Mandalay Region